Shelby Rogers was the defending champion, but lost in the first round.

Wildcard Taylor Townsend won the tournament, defeating qualifier Montserrat González in the final, 6–2, 6–3.

Seeds

Main draw

Finals

Top half

Bottom half

References 
 Main draw

Boyd Tinsley Women's Clay Court Classic - Singles